Araneta may refer to:

Araneta family, prominent Filipino-Spanish family in business, politics and religion
Araneta City, commercial area in Quezon City, Philippines
Araneta Coliseum, indoor stadium in the Araneta City
De La Salle Araneta University, Lasallian university in Malabon, Philippines
Ian Araneta, Filipino footballer